Siim Kallas' cabinet was in office in Estonia from 28 January 2002 to 10 April 2003, when it was succeeded by Juhan Parts' cabinet.

Members

This cabinet's members were the following:
 Siim Kallas – Prime Minister
 Ain Seppik – Minister of Interior Affairs
 Kristiina Ojuland – Minister of Foreign Affairs
 Märt Rask – Minister of Justice
 Liina Tõnisson – Minister of Economic Affairs and Communications

References

Cabinets of Estonia